Michibata (written: 道端) is a Japanese surname. Notable people with the surname include:

, Japanese model
Glenn Michibata (born 1962), Canadian tennis player and coach
, Japanese model

Japanese-language surnames